The Festival des 3 Continents is an annual film festival held since 1979 in Nantes, France, and is devoted to the cinemas of Asia, and Africa and Latin America. It was founded by Philippe and Alain Jalladeau.  The top award in the festival's competition is the balloon shaped Montgolfiere d'or.  In conjunction with the festival is the Produire au Sud, or Producers of the South, a project that provides funding to independent film productions from Asia, Africa and Latin America.

List of Montgolfière d'or winners

Further reading
Asia's magic lantern,
Festival of Three Continents
Ain't It Cool, "Euro-AICN: Festival des 3 Continents in Nantes; PrisonFish; Speed of Light; Bond; Shame'sPhotos; Pinocchio; StarWars"
Soul Beats Africa, "3 Continents Film Festival - Africa, Asia, Latin America"
The Cunning Canary, "International Theatre Festival of Three Continents"

References

External links 
Nantes Three Continents Festival at the Internet Movie Database
Three Continents Festival Official website
ftvdb.bfi.org
Produire au Sud

Film festivals established in 1979
Film festivals in France
Tourist attractions in Nantes
Latin American film festivals
1979 establishments in France